Anthony Medel (born March 28, 1978) is a male beach volleyball player from the United States who won the gold medal at the NORCECA Circuit 2009 at Guatemala playing with Hans Stolfus.

He has also participated in the Association of Volleyball Professionals tournaments since 1999.

Anthony has continued with the sport of volleyball coaching club, junior high and high school teams while pursuing his master's degree in education.

Awards

National Team
 NORCECA Beach Volleyball Circuit Guatemala 2009  Gold Medal

AVP Pro Tour
 Miami 2009  Bronze Medal
 Miami 2008  Bronze Medal
 Atlanta 2008  Silver Medal
 Belmar 2008  Bronze Medal
 Boulder 2008  Silver Medal
 Seaside Heights 2007  Bronze Medal
 Manhattan Beach 2007  Bronze Medal
 Boston 2007  Bronze Medal

References

External links
 
 
 Anthony Medel at the Association of Volleyball Professionals (archived)
 Mizuno Long Beach Volleyball Club Bio
 Anthony Medel Volleyball Videos

1978 births
Living people
American men's beach volleyball players
Sportspeople from Redondo Beach, California